Bruce Inniss (8 February 1912 – 10 December 1976) was a Barbadian cricketer. He played in one first-class match for the Barbados cricket team in 1942/43.

See also
 List of Barbadian representative cricketers

References

External links
 

1912 births
1976 deaths
Barbadian cricketers
Barbados cricketers
People from Saint Michael, Barbados